Maulana Nazar-ur-Rehman   is an Islamic preacher and the current Ameer (Head) of Tablighi Jamaat in Pakistan.  Maulana Haji Nazur Rahman, the new leader of Tablighi Jamaat, is from village "Bilawal" of Tehsil and District Rawalpindi. This village is located on the other side of the river Swan, 10 kilometers west of Chakri from Rawalpindi. Before Pakistan Tehsil Fateh Jang was included in Campbellpur district, Maulana Nazur Rahman was born in 1929 in the house of late Hafiz Ghulam Mohiuddin, Hafiz Ghulam Mohiuddin was a pious person and one of the devotees of Hazrat Pir Meher Ali Shah. He used to go to Golra Sharif on foot to meet Pir Saheb due to limited access. The three sons of Hafiz Ghulam Mohiuddin, Haji Hafiz Fazl Hussain, Hafiz Muhammad Siddique alias Muhammad Ji and Maulana Nazarur Rahman were identified as Bamsami.

Early life
According to the contents of Hamad Nazir Ranjha's History and Tazikra of Khanqah Sirajiya Naqshbandiyya Mujadiya: "Maulana Nazrul Rehman received his initial education from Maulana Abdul Khaliq in Mauza Bhatral district, Rawalpindi, later from Mufti Abdul Hai Qureshi and Darul Uloom Rabbaniyya in Bhuigad. Studied higher books from Hazrat Maulana Fariduddin Qureshi. In 1949 and 1950, he completed the Daora Hadith (Learning of Hadith with Tafseer) from Sheikh Al-Hadith Maulana Sultan Mahmood Fazil Deoband and disciple Hazrat Sheikh Al-Hind Maulana Mahmood Hasan Deobandi in Madrasah Khadim Uloom Nabubuat, Kathiala Sheikhan District, Gujarat."
After completing Islamic studies, he returned to his village "Bilawal" and stayed in the village from 1950 to 1955. At that time, his elder brother Haji Hafiz Fazl Hussain was leading the village mosque. He expressed his wish to his brother Haji Hafiz Fazl Hussain that he wanted to take over the Imamate of the mosque which his brother handed over to him and his brother Haji Hafiz Fazl Hussain himself started Imamat in a mosque near Jatli, a village of Hasal Sharif in Tehsil Gujar Khan on Khudmandara Chakwal Road.

Joining World Tableeghi Mission Center (تبلیغی مركز)
After spending four years in the village, he came to Buigarh, from there he continued to lead prayers and preach in the mosque of Taxila and DM Textile Mills Dhok Hasu Rawalpindi, from there he went to teach in Zakaria Masjid Rawalpindi, later Saying goodbye to DM Textiles. He attached himself permanently to Zakaria mosque (west ridge, Rawalpindi) and started teaching and preaching over there for ten years he took over important responsibilities at the World Tableeghi Mission Center (تبلیغی مركز) in Raiwind, near Lahore and remain one of the first 20 members of Tablighi Jamaat in Pakistan and have been performing responsibilities under the Jamaat order for a long time along with the late Haji Abdul Wahab. Late Haji Abdul Wahab had bequeathed in a will written on  17 November 2015 that after my death one of Maulana Muhammad Nazur Rahman, Maulana Ahmed Batla and Maulana Ubaidullah Khurshid should be appointed as Amir and Maulana Muhammad Nazur Rahman should lead my funeral prayer. On 20 November 2018 Following the demise of Haji Abdul Wahab, Maulana Nazar-ur-Rehman has been appointed as new Ameer (head) of the Tableeghi Jamaat.

References

External links

1929 births
Deobandis
Tablighi Jamaat people
Living people
Date of birth missing (living people)
People from Rawalpindi
Emirs of Tablighi Jamaat